is the eleventh studio album by Japanese rock band Mucc, released on November 28, 2012. It continues the sound used in their previous album Karma, this time with elements of metalcore (making a return for the first time since Kyūtai).

Overview
The album's third single "Mother" was released on October 31 and was an ending theme of Naruto Shippuden. Its B-side "Negative Dancer" features the audience of Mucc's September 13, 2012 concert singing the chorus.

Shangri-La was released in three different versions, all of them with the thirteen regular tracks; the Limited and Complete Production versions including a bonus CD with recordings of their 15th Anniversary tour.

"G.G" was used as an image song for the Japanese release of the 2012 film The Woman in Black.

"Kyōran Kyoshō -21st Century Baby-" was remixed and used as the theme of the 2013 live-action film adaptation of Fuan no Tane.

Track listing

Disc 2 - Limited Edition CD 
 -Mucc 15th Anniversary year Live(s)-"97-12″ 2012.09.13 Sendai Rensa
 Kokuen
 Fuzz -Thunder Groove Ver.-
 Gekkō
 Tōei
 Shōfu
 Kokoiro
 Akatsuki Yami
 Ieji
 Ryūsei
 Yasashii Uta

Disc 2 - Complete Production Edition CD 
 -Mucc 15th Anniversary year Live(s)- "97-12″ 2012.09.16 Zepp Nagoya
 Fukurō no Yurikago
 Anjelier
 Zetsubō
 Gentō Sanka
 Kare ga Shinda Hi
 4-gatsu no Rengesō
 Nijūgoji no Yūutsu
 Tsuki no Yoru
 Ame no Orchestra
 Kurutta Kajitsu (Warau)

Note
 Re-recordings of "Mr. Liar" and "Mad Yack" were featured on their 2017 self-cover album Koroshi no Shirabe II This is Not Greatest Hits.

Covers 
"Mr. Liar", "Nirvana", and "Honey" were covered by Hysteric Panic, Granrodeo, and Band-Maid respectively, on the 2017 Mucc tribute album Tribute of Mucc -En-. Band-Maid's version of "Honey" is also included on the standard edition of their album World Domination.

"Nirvana" was covered by Fantôme Iris, a fictional visual kei rock band from the multimedia franchise Argonavis from BanG Dream! and was added to the game AAside on March 31, 2021. The song was also performed on their first solo live as a real band, Fantôme Iris 1st Live -C'est la vie!- on May 5, 2021. The full version of their cover is included on the album Argonavis Cover Collection -Mix-, which was released on November 17, 2021.

References

2012 albums
Mucc albums
Sony Music Entertainment Japan albums